Özhan Çıvgın (born June 6, 1979) is a Turkish professional basketball coach, who is now the head coach for ONVO Büyükçekmece of the Turkish Basketball Super League (BSL).

External links
Özhan Çıvgın Maçkolik Profile
Tüyap Büyükçekmece Career History

1979 births
Living people
Basketbol Süper Ligi head coaches
Karşıyaka basketball coaches
Turkish basketball coaches